The English Bowls Association was the governing body of bowls in England until 2007. From 2008 onwards, Bowls England was formed, which now runs the sport. The National Finals for bowls are held annually, where either 1, 2 or 3 representatives from each county compete for the national titles.

Bowls England was inaugurated after two associations unified to form it, the English Bowling Association (EBA) and the English Women's Bowling Association (EWBA). The events are categorised into national championships and national competitions; below are the men's national competitions.

Men's national competitions

Men's champion of champions singles

Men's county (Middleton Cup) champions

Men's Balcomb Trophy champions

Men's White Rose Trophy champions

Men's club two fours champions

Men's top club champions

Men's senior singles champions

Men's senior pairs champions

See also
Men's National Championships
Women's National Championships
Women's National Competitions
Mixed National Competitions

References

Bowls in England